was a Methodist minister famous for his work for the Hiroshima Maidens.  He was one of the six Hiroshima survivors whose experiences of the bomb and later life are portrayed in John Hersey's book Hiroshima.

Biography
Tanimoto converted to Christianity in his youth, opposed by his Buddhist father. He studied at the Candler School of Theology in Atlanta, Georgia, on an international Methodist scholarship. Ordained a minister at Emory University in 1940, he served in churches in California, Okinawa and then Hiroshima.

After the war he went on extensive speaking tours of the US, raising funds for his project of a Hiroshima peace center, and for the Hiroshima Maidens. On May 11, 1955 he unwittingly appeared on a television program popular in the United States at that time, This Is Your Life, where he, his wife, and his four children, including his daughter and eventual peace activist, Koko Kondo, were placed in the uncomfortable position of meeting with Captain Robert A. Lewis, copilot of the Enola Gay, which dropped the first atomic bomb on Hiroshima. Due to these public activities he developed an unwanted reputation as a publicity seeker and attracted the attention of the US and Japanese authorities as a potential "anti-nuke trouble-maker". In 1972, he was interviewed by Thames Television, for the 24th episode of the acclaimed British documentary television series, The World at War.

The annual Kiyoshi Tanimoto Peace Prize is named after him.

See also
 Humanitarianism
 Humanitarian aid
 Peace education
 Philanthropy
 Religion and peacebuilding
 World peace

References

External links
 Tanimoto peace foundation
 Biography (Kansai Gakuin University) 
 Kiyoshi Tanimoto collection, 1938-1990 at Pitts Theology Library, Candler School of Theology

Hibakusha
Japanese people of World War II
Japanese humanitarians
Japanese activists
Japanese Methodists
Methodist ministers
20th-century Methodist ministers
People from Kagawa Prefecture
Converts to Christianity
1909 births
1986 deaths